The Roger B. Taney Monument is a statue of Roger B. Taney (1777–1864), who was the fifth Chief Justice of the Supreme Court, installed in Annapolis, Maryland, on the State House grounds. The sculpture, by the artist William Henry Rinehart, was unveiled on December 10, 1872. The sculpture, made of bronze, was commissioned by the Legislature of Maryland.

Removal from State House grounds
In August 2014, House Speaker Michael E. Busch and Governor Larry Hogan called for its removal. On August 16, 2017, a majority of the members of the Maryland State House Trust voted to move the statue from the State House grounds to storage. Taney was the author of the infamous Dred Scott decision.   It was removed on August 18, 2017.

See also
 Roger B. Taney (sculpture), Baltimore

References

1872 establishments in Maryland
1872 sculptures
Buildings and structures in Annapolis, Maryland
History of racism in Maryland
Outdoor sculptures in Maryland
Relocated buildings and structures in Maryland
Sculptures of men in Maryland
Statues in Maryland